Ludwik Abramowicz is the name of:

 Ludwik Abramowicz (1888–1966), Polish/Lithuanian teacher
 Ludwik Abramowicz (1879–1939), krajowcy activist, essayist, newspaper editor

See also
Abramowicz (surname)